Adrian Fisher is an American politician, businessman, and pastor serving as a member of the Louisiana House of Representatives from the 16th district. He assumed office on December 6, 2021.

Education 
Fisher earned a Bachelor of Science degree in accounting from Southern University and a Master of Science in community counseling from the University of Louisiana at Monroe.

Career 
Outside of politics, Fisher is a licensed counselor and operates a behavioral health business. He was elected to the Louisiana House of Representatives in November 2021 and assumed office on December 6, 2021.

References 

Living people
Democratic Party members of the Louisiana House of Representatives
Southern University alumni
University of Louisiana at Monroe alumni
Year of birth missing (living people)